Walter Tetley (born Walter Campbell Tetzlaff; June 2, 1915 – September 4, 1975) was an American actor specializing in child impersonation during radio's classic era, with regular roles as Leroy Forrester on The Great Gildersleeve and Julius Abbruzzio on The Phil Harris-Alice Faye Show, as well as continuing as a voice-over artist in animated cartoons, commercials, and spoken-word record albums. He is perhaps best known as the voice of Sherman in the Jay Ward-Bill Scott Mr. Peabody TV cartoons.

Career
Tetley's foray into voices for theatrical cartoons began in 1936, as the voice of Felix the Cat in three of Van Beuren's Rainbow Parade cartoon shorts: The Goose That Laid the Golden Egg, Neptune Nonsense, and Bold King Cole. The latter short starts with Tetley singing "Nature and Me", showcasing his song styling abilities. For his entire adult life, Tetley had the voice and appearance of a preteen boy, which led to him largely taking voice roles for young boys. The exact cause was never confirmed - while co-star Bill Scott half-jokingly claimed that Tetley had been castrated, it is also possible that he had Kallmann syndrome. Whatever the cause, his unusual situation would allow him to hold roles for young boys far longer than actual boys of that age could before their voices would lower due to puberty.

In the late 1930s, he was often featured in Fred Allen's Town Hall Tonight. When Allen took his cast to Hollywood to film Love Thy Neighbor in 1940, Tetley decided to stay in the Coast, working on several radio shows, including The Great Gildersleeve, on which he portrayed Gildy's nephew Leroy until the show's end in 1958.

In the late 1940s, he was the voice of Andy Panda in the Walter Lantz Productions cartoons distributed by Universal Pictures.

In 1946, Tetley supplied the voice of the electric utility mascot Reddy Kilowatt in the short film Reddy Made Magic, produced by Lantz with Reddy Kilowatt creator Ashton B. Collins, Sr.; Tetley also performed the film's theme song. In 1959 he reprised the role in a John Sutherland-produced remake called The Mighty Atom.

In the late 1950s and early 1960s, Walter would become familiar to a new generation as the voice of Sherman, the nerdy, freckled, bespectacled boy sidekick of time-traveling dog genius Mr. Peabody, in the "Peabody's Improbable History" segments of Jay Ward's Rocky and His Friends (also known as The Bullwinkle Show), which made its debut in 1959.

Tetley worked for Capitol Records in the 1950s, providing an array of juvenile voices for the label's spoken-word and comedy albums, including Stan Freberg Presents the United States of America Volume One: The Early Years (1961). His Gildersleeve co-star, Harold Peary, had made three albums for Capitol a decade earlier, telling children's stories Gildersleeve-style.

In 1973 Tetley made an appearance on Rod Serling's radio series The Zero Hour. He could be heard in the "Princess Stakes Murder" episodes beginning the week of November 19.

"The Sheriff of Fetterman's Crossing", an episode of Serling's 1965 TV series The Loner, featured guest star Allan Sherman as a character named Walter Peterson Tetley.

Death
In 1971, Tetley was seriously injured in a motorcycle accident and used a wheelchair for the rest of his life.  He died at the age of 60 on September 4, 1975, having never fully recovered from his injuries. His interment was in Chatsworth's Oakwood Memorial Park.

Filmography

Live-action
A Trip to Paris (1938) - Page Boy
Lord Jeff (1938) - Tommy Thrums
Sons of the Legion (1938) - Shifty
King of Alcatraz (1938) - Newsboy
Prairie Moon (1938) - Clarence "Nails" Barton
Boy Slaves (1939) - Pee Wee
You Can't Cheat an Honest Man (1939) - Boy with Candy Cane (uncredited)
The Spirit of Culver (1939) - Hank
The Family Next Door (1939) - Boy (uncredited)
They Shall Have Music (1939) - Rocks Mulligan
First Love (1939) - Willie, Country Club Page (uncredited)
Tower of London (1939) - Chimney Sweep
Emergency Squad (1940) - Matt (uncredited)
Framed (1940) - Murphy (uncredited)
My Son, My Son! (1940) - Newsboy (uncredited)
Tom Brown's School Days (1940) - Student (uncredited)
Military Academy (1940) - Cadet Blackburn
Under Texas Skies (1940) - Theodore
The Villain Still Pursued Her (1940) - Telegram Boy (uncredited)
A Little Bit of Heaven (1940) - Boy in Crowd (uncredited)
Let's Make Music (1941) - Eddie
Ride, Kelly, Ride (1941) - Jockey (uncredited)
Horror Island (1941) - Delivery Boy (uncredited)
The Devil and Miss Jones (1941) - Stock Boy
Out of the Fog (1941) - Buddy
It Started with Eve (1941) - Messenger (uncredited)
Sing Your Worries Away (1942) - Messenger Boy with Telegram (uncredited)
Broadway (1942) - Western Union Messenger (uncredited)
The Pride of the Yankees (1942) - Cake Delivery Boy (uncredited)
Invisible Agent (1942) - Newsboy (uncredited)
A Yank at Eton (1942) - Newsboy (uncredited)
Moonlight in Havana (1942) - Newsboy (uncredited)
Thunder Birds: Soldiers of the Air (1942) - Messenger Boy
Who Done it? (1942) - Elevator Operator (uncredited)
Random Harvest (1942) - Call Boy (uncredited)
The Gorilla Man (1943) - Sammy
It Comes Up Love (1943) - Delivery Boy (uncredited)
Henry Aldrich Gets Glamour (1943) - Classroom Student (uncredited)
Gildersleeve on Broadway (1943) - The Bellhop (uncredited)
Mystery Broadcast (1943) - Page Boy (uncredited)
The Lodger (1944) - Call Boy
Her Primitive Man (1944) - Bellhop (uncredited)
Pin Up Girl (1944) - Messenger Boy (uncredited)
Follow the Boys (1944) - Soldier (uncredited)
Casanova Brown (1944) - Florist's Assistant (uncredited)
Bowery to Broadway (1944) - Attendant (uncredited)
I'll Remember April (1945) - Mail Boy (uncredited)
It's in the Bag! (1945) - 2nd Elevator Operator (uncredited)
Molly and Me (1945) - Grocery Boy
Red Garters (1954) - Gun-toting Kid (voice, uncredited)

Animation
The Goose That Laid the Golden Egg (1936) - Felix the Cat
Neptune Nonsense (1936) - Felix the Cat
Bold King Cole (1936) - Felix the Cat
Adventures of Tom Thumb Jr. (1940) - Tom Thumb Jr.
The Haunted Mouse (1941) - Mouse
The Painter and the Pointer (1944) - Andy Panda (uncredited)
Crow Crazy (1945) - Andy Panda (uncredited)
Apple Andy (1946) - Andy Panda (uncredited)
Mousie Comes Home (1946) - Andy Panda (uncredited)
The Wacky Weed (1946) - Andy Panda, Glads (uncredited)
Banquet Busters (1948) - Andy Panda, Mouse (uncredited)
Playful Pelican (1948) - Andy Panda (uncredited)
Dog Tax Dodgers (1948) - Andy Panda (uncredited)
Scrappy Birthday (1948) - Andy Panda (uncredited)
Georgie and the Dragon (1951) - Georgie (uncredited)
The Woody Woodpecker Show (1957) - Andy Panda
The Best of Mr. Peabody & Sherman (1959) - Sherman
Rocky and His Friends (1959–1961) - Sherman, Joey Tell, Girl
The Bullwinkle Show (1961–1963) - Sherman, Joey Tell, Girl
The Dudley Do-Right Show (1969) - Additional voices
A Christmas Story (1972) - Timmy

References

Notes

External links

 Tetley Tribute at WFMU

1915 births
1975 deaths
American male voice actors
American male radio actors
Male actors from New York City
20th-century American male actors
Burials at Oakwood Memorial Park Cemetery
Walter Lantz Productions people